Grakhovo (Grah) is a rural locality (a selo) and the administrative center of Grakhovsky District in the Udmurt Republic, Russia. Population:

References

Rural localities in Udmurtia
Yelabuzhsky Uyezd